Czartowo may refer to the following places:
Czartowo, Greater Poland Voivodeship (west-central Poland)
Czartowo, Lubusz Voivodeship (west Poland)
Czartowo, West Pomeranian Voivodeship (north-west Poland)